Richard Vincent Guerin (born May 29, 1932) is an American former professional basketball player and coach. He played with the National Basketball Association's (NBA) New York Knicks from 1956 to 1963 and was a player-coach of the St. Louis/Atlanta Hawks franchise where he spent nine years. On February 15, 2013, the Naismith Memorial Basketball Hall of Fame announced that Guerin had been elected as one of its 2013 inductees.

He served in the Marine Corps Reserve from 1947 to 1954. While a reservist, Guerin attended Iona College from 1950 to 1954 where he scored 1,375 points in 67 games playing for coach Jim McDermott. After graduation, Guerin served on active duty at Marine Corps Schools, Quantico, Virginia for two years.

The Knicks drafted Guerin with the 8th pick in the second round of the 1954 NBA draft while still on active duty. After leaving the Marine Corps, Guerin would begin his professional basketball career in 1956.

Richie Guerin was a high-scoring point guard in the late 1950s and early 1960s. As a member of the New York Knicks, his feisty on-court style and wisecracking off-court demeanor catered to Madison Square Garden crowds.

Guerin was a gifter scorer, passer, playmaker, and was one of the most successful rebounding and driving guards of his era. He led the Knicks in assists for five consecutive seasons and in scoring three times during his seven full seasons in the Big Apple, and he tallied more than 20 points per game in four consecutive years. Guerin also set Knicks single-game records for scoring, with 57 points in 1959, and assists, with 21 in 1958. His 57-point game stood as a Knicks record until Bernard King scored 60 on Christmas Day in 1984.

A fan and media favorite, Guerin played in six consecutive NBA All-Star Games. As a team, New York struggled, reaching the playoffs only once during Guerin's tenure. He was traded to the St. Louis Hawks midway through the 1963–64 season and spent the next eight years as the team's player-coach and then head coach. With St. Louis (and eventually Atlanta), Guerin played alongside Bob Pettit, Lou Hudson, Lenny Wilkens, and Cliff Hagan. Guerin helped the Hawks to nine consecutive playoff appearances and was named NBA Coach of the Year for 1967–68.

NBA career

New York Knicks
Guerin grew up in the Bronx and enrolled at Iona College in 1950 where he played center for coach Jim McDermott. New York selected him in the 1954 NBA draft, but Guerin could not join the Knicks until he had completed two years of service in the Marines.

New York was struggling through the mid-1950s at or near the bottom of the Eastern Division. Among the only successful players during that period were high-scoring guard Carl Braun, point guard Dick McGuire, and center Harry Gallatin. Turnover on the team was high.

Guerin joined the club in 1956 and quickly established himself. In his second season he made the NBA All-Star Team for the first of six straight years. In his third year Guerin led the Knicks in assists (5.1 apg) and ranked second in scoring (18.2 ppg). He made a (then) team-record 21 assists against St. Louis on December 12, 1958. The 21 assists he totaled were also Madison Square Garden high until John Stockton broke the record 41 years later. That year New York made its only postseason appearance with Guerin on the team, losing to the Syracuse Nationals in a first-round sweep.

By Guerin's fourth year in the league he had established himself as a scorer. He made both long shots and layups on his way to a team-leading 21.8 points per game in 1959–60. His 57 points against Syracuse on December 11 broke Braun's previous team record of 47.

In 1960–61 Guerin again averaged 21.8 points, adding 7.9 rebounds and 6.4 assists per contest. He then had his best season in 1961–62, averaging 29.5 points and a career-high 6.9 assists in 42.9 minutes per game. Guerin ranked sixth in the league in scoring and fourth in assists, and he became the first Knicks player ever to score 2,000 points in a season (2,303). He ended that season as one of eight NBA players to ever have 2000+ points, 500+ rebounds and 500+ assists in a season.  By the end of the campaign Guerin had firmly established himself among the league's backcourt elite. He was named to the All-NBA Second Team for the third time in his first six seasons.

In the 1962–63, Guerin averaged a team-leading 21.5 points. He ranked seventh in the league in scoring, eighth in assists (4.4 apg), and second in free-throw percentage (.848). Two games into the 1963–64 season, the Knicks traded Guerin to the St. Louis Hawks for cash and a second-round draft choice. When he left the Knicks, Guerin ranked second on the team's all-time scoring list behind Carl Braun. In his first appearance at the Garden in a Hawks uniform, Knicks fans showed their gratitude by giving Guerin a five-minute standing ovation.

St. Louis/Atlanta Hawks

Guerin joined a Hawks team loaded with offensive weapons, and his production dropped accordingly to 13.1 points per game in 1963–64. He became the Hawks' player-coach on December 28, 1964, replacing Harry Gallatin who was fired despite the Hawks being in second place in the NBA Western Division. At the time, he was one of two player-coaches in the NBA, with the Detroit Pistons' Dave DeBusschere being the other. St. Louis had gone 17–16 under Gallatin, and the team went 28–19 under Guerin. The Hawks earned a playoff spot but lost to the Baltimore Bullets in a division semifinal series. Under Guerin's direction, the Hawks reached the playoffs in each of the next seven seasons.

Guerin played two more full seasons, averaging 14.9 points in 1965–66 and 13.8 in 1966–67. After the Seattle expansion team drafted him in 1967, he announced his retirement as a player. As a coach, he guided the Hawks to a 56–26 record and the Western Division championship and being named NBA Coach of the Year for 1967–1968.

The Hawks moved to Atlanta prior to the 1968–69 season, and Seattle traded him back, allowing him to return to playing as a reserve player, guiding the Hawks to a 48–34 record while appearing as a player in 27 games. In the 1969–70 season he guided them to another 48–34 record while appearing as a player in 8 games.

The fourth game of the 1970 Western Division Finals against the Los Angeles Lakers on April 19, 1970 was Guerin's last game as a player. He contributed 31 points, 5 rebounds, and 3 assists, but his team failed to avoid a four-game sweep.

Guerin stayed on as head coach for two more seasons, and Atlanta went 36–46 each year. He compiled a 327–291 career coaching record. Notably, Guerin was Pete Maravich's first pro head coach during those two seasons. Guerin was promoted to general manager on April 24, 1972. His successor as head coach was Cotton Fitzsimmons who was appointed just over five weeks later on May 31. Guerin was fired on August 4, 1973 despite having four years remaining on a five‐year contract. Feeling the need for a promoter as general manager, the Hawks replaced Guerin with Pat Williams two days later on August 6.

NBA career statistics

Regular season

Playoffs

Head coaching record

|-
| align="left" |St. Louis
| align="left" |
|47||28||19|||| align="center" |2nd in West||4||1||3||
| align="center" |Lost in Div. Semifinals
|-
| align="left" |St. Louis
| align="left" |
|80||36||44|||| align="center" |3rd in West||10||6||4||
| align="center" |Lost in Div. Finals
|-
| align="left" |St. Louis
| align="left" |
|81||39||42|||| align="center" |2nd in West||9||5||4||
| align="center" |Lost in Div. Finals
|-
| align="left" |St. Louis
| align="left" |
|82||56||26|||| align="center" |1st in West||6||2||4||
| align="center" |Lost in Div. Semifinals
|-
| align="left" |Atlanta
| align="left" |
|82||48||34|||| align="center" |2nd in West||11||5||6||
| align="center" |Lost in Div. Finals
|-
| align="left" |Atlanta
| align="left" |
|82||48||34|||| align="center" |1st in West||9||4||5||
| align="center" |Lost in Div. Finals
|-
| align="left" |Atlanta
| align="left" |
|82||36||46|||| align="center" |2nd in West||5||1||4||
| align="center" |Lost in Div. Semifinals
|-
| align="left" |Atlanta
| align="left" |
|82||36||46|||| align="center" |2nd in West||6||2||4||
| align="center" |Lost in Div. Semifinals
|-class="sortbottom"
| align="left" |Career
| ||618||327||291|||| ||60||26||34||

Marine Corps
Guerin enlisted in the Marine Corps Reserve and served from 1947 to 1954. While a reservist Guerin attended Iona College from 1950 to 1954, and upon graduation was commissioned a second lieutenant. He served on active duty with the T&T Regt, MCS, Quantico, Virginia until his discharge as a first lieutenant in June 1956. He was awarded the National Defense Service Medal and the Organized MCR Medal.

Guerin was inducted into the Marine Corps Sports Hall of Fame in 2004.

Personal
Following his retirement from professional basketball, Guerin became a Knicks sportscaster and a Wall Street stockbroker. Guerin retired in 2005 following a 31-year stint first as a broker, then as managing director, for Bear, Stearns & Co. Guerin, who has four children and nine grandchildren, now resides in Palm Beach, Florida with his wife, Pat.

See also
List of National Basketball Association players with most assists in a game

References

External links

 
 Richie Guerin career stats

1932 births
Living people
Amateur Athletic Union men's basketball players
American men's basketball coaches
American men's basketball players
American sports announcers
American stockbrokers
Atlanta Hawks head coaches
Atlanta Hawks players
Basketball coaches from New York (state)
Basketball players from New York City
Bear Stearns
Iona Gaels men's basketball players
Naismith Memorial Basketball Hall of Fame inductees
National Basketball Association All-Stars
New York Knicks announcers
New York Knicks draft picks
New York Knicks players
Point guards
Seattle SuperSonics expansion draft picks
Shooting guards
Sportspeople from the Bronx
Sportspeople from Palm Beach, Florida
St. Louis Hawks head coaches
St. Louis Hawks players
United States Marine Corps officers
United States Marine Corps reservists